Algebraic enumeration is a subfield of enumeration that deals with finding exact formulas for the number of combinatorial objects of a given type, rather than estimating this number asymptotically. Methods of finding these formulas include generating functions and the solution of recurrence relations.

References

Enumerative combinatorics